The Museum of the Royal Tombs of Aigai (Vergina) is located 75 km west of Thessaloniki, Greece, centered around the royal tombs built by the ancient Kingdom of Macedon at Aigai. The underground museum containing the burial cluster of Philip II of Macedon began construction in 1993 and was inaugurated in 1997. Exhibits are presented in four interconnected areas, including the Palace, the royal burial cluster of the Temenid dynasty (burial cluster "C"), the burial cluster of Philip II , and a gateway entrance with a semi-open-air exhibition of the sculptures found in the city sanctuaries and the restored upper floor of the Palace of Philip's facade. The tombs and other archeological sites of Aigai were inscribed on the UNESCO World Heritage List in 1996 because of its exceptional architecture and testimony to the transition between city-states and empires in European civilization.

The collections housed in the museum are the grave goods recovered from a series of archaeological excavations beginning in 1861 and continue to the present day.

Archaeology

Archaeologists were interested in the burial mounds around Vergina as early as the 1855 AD, supposing that the site of Aigai was in the vicinity. However, nothing more than empty tombs were found. Excavations began again in 1861 under the French archaeologist Leon Heuzey, sponsored by Napoleon III. Parts of a large building that was considered to be one of the palaces of Antigonus III Doson (263–221 BC), partly destroyed by fire, were discovered near Palatitsa, which preserved the memory of a palace in its modern name.  The excavators suggested that this was the site of the ancient city of Valla, a view that prevailed until 1976. However, the excavations had to be abandoned because of the risk of malaria.

The first royal tomb was discovered by Konstantinos Romaios, professor of archaeology at  Aristotle University of Thessaloniki who uncovered it while working in the remains of the palace  between 1937 and 1940.  Much of the palace had been scavenged for construction materials by Greek refugees, who had been resettled there from Turkish Anatolia after the Greco-Turkish War.  They built a new settlement at the site which they named Vergina after a legendary queen in 1922. But, the excavations were abandoned on the outbreak of war with Italy in 1940.  World War II was followed by the Greek Civil War (1946-1949).

In 1949, excavations were finally resumed by Manolis Andronikos. Andronikos completed the palace excavations in 1970 then turned his attention to the Great Tumulus that he was convinced was a burial mound concealing the tombs of the Macedonian kings. There, in 1977, Andronikos uncovered  four buried tombs, two of which had never been disturbed. Andronikos identified these as the tomb of Philip II, father of Alexander the Great (Tomb II) and also of Alexander IV of Macedon, son of Alexander the Great and Roxana (Tomb III).

In 1987, a burial cluster including the tomb of Queen Eurydice I was discovered. Between 1991 and 2009, over 1,000 tombs were excavated along with city districts, farm houses, cemeteries, streets, sanctuaries and parts of the city fortification. A royal burial cluster of the Temenids, an ancient Macedonian royal house of Dorian Greek provenance,  is also revealed. Then in March 2014, five more royal tombs thought to possibly belong to Alexander I of Macedon and his family or to the family of Cassander were discovered.

Exhibition areas

Among the objects found in the tomb of Philip II were a golden larnax emblazoned with the sixteen-rayed "Sun of Vergina" on its lid, containing the king's bones, an intricate gold burial wreath, a silver and gold diadem with Heracles knot, silver and bronze vessels from the funeral feast, and carved ivory ornaments from the funeral couch.  Gold armour and greaves with one custom fitted to Philip's leg deformed by an improperly healed broken tibia, ivory inlaid shields, weapons, ivory reliefs, jewelry, and terracotta votive figurines were also found.  Similar objects found in the other tombs, including the jewelry and body adornments from the 9th century BC "Lady of Aigai" are also presented.

Gallery

References

Museums in Greece
Archaeological museums in Central Macedonia
Philip II of Macedon
1993 establishments in Greece
Tombs in Greece
Buildings and structures in Imathia